The Diocese of Passau is a Roman Catholic diocese in Germany that is a suffragan of the Archdiocese of Munich and Freising. Though similar in name to the Prince-Bishopric of Passau—an ecclesiastical principality that existed for centuries until it was secularized in 1803—the two are entirely different entities. The diocese covers an area of 5,442 km².

Pope Benedict XVI was born and baptized on Holy Saturday, 16 April 1927, at Marktl am Inn, which is located within the Diocese of Passau.

History

The Diocese of Passau may be considered the successor of the ancient Diocese of Lorch (Laureacum). At Lorch, a Roman station and an important stronghold at the confluence of the rivers Enns and Danube, Christianity found a foothold in the third century, during a period of Roman domination, and a Bishop of Lorch certainly existed in the fourth. During the great migrations, Christianity on the Danube was completely rooted out, and the Celtic and Roman population was annihilated or enslaved.

In the region between the rivers Lech and Enns, the wandering Baiuvarii were converted to Christianity in the seventh century, while the Avari, to the east, remained pagan. The ecclesiastical organization of Bavaria was brought about by St. Boniface, who, with the support of Duke Odilo or at least enacting an earlier design of the duke, erected the four sees of Freising, Ratisbon, Passau, and Salzburg. He confirmed as incumbent of Passau, Bishop Vivilo, or Vivolus, who had been ordained by Pope Gregory III, and who was for a long time the only bishop in Bavaria. Thenceforth, Vivilo resided permanently at Passau, on the site of the old Roman colony of Batavis. Here was a church, the founder of which is not known, dedicated to St. Stephen. To Bishop Vivilo's diocese was annexed the ancient Lorch, which meanwhile had become a small and unimportant place. By the duke's generosity, a cathedral was soon erected near the Church of St. Stephen, and here the bishop lived in common with his clergy.

The boundaries of the diocese extended westwards to the river Isar, and eastwards to the Enns. In ecclesiastical affairs Passau was probably, from the beginning, suffragan to Salzburg. Through the favour of Dukes Odilo and Tassilo, the bishopric received many gifts, and several monasteries arose—e.g. Niederaltaich Abbey, Niedernburg Abbey, Mattsee Abbey, Kremsmünster Abbey—which were richly endowed. Under Bishop Waltreich (774–804), after the conquest of the Avari, who had assisted the rebellious Duke Tassilo, the district between the Enns and the Raab was added to the diocese, which thus included the whole eastern part (Ostmark) of Southern Bavaria and part of what is now Hungary. The first missionaries to the pagan Hungarians went out from Passau, and in 866 the Church sent missionaries to Bulgaria.

Passau, the outermost eastern bulwark of the Germans, suffered most from the incursions of the Hungarians. At that time many churches and monasteries were destroyed. When, after the victory the Battle of Lech, the Germans pressed forward and regained the old Ostmark, Bishop Adalbert (946-971) hoped to extend his spiritual jurisdiction over Hungary. His successor Piligrim (971-991), who worked successfully for the Christianization of Pannonia, aspired to free Passau from the metropolitan authority of Salzburg, but was completely frustrated in this, as well as in his attempt to assert the metropolitan claims which Passau was supposed to have inherited from Lorch, and to include all Hungary in his diocese. By founding many monasteries in his diocese he prepared the way for the princely power of later bishops. He also built many new churches and restored others from ruins. His successor, Christian (991-1002) received in 999 from Emperor Otto III the market privilege and the rights of coinage, taxation, and higher and lower jurisdiction. Emperor Henry II granted him a large part of the North Forest. Henceforward, indeed, the bishops ruled as princes of the empire, although the title was used for the first time only in a document in 1193. Under Berengar (1013–1045) the whole district east of the Viennese forest as far as Letha and March was placed under the jurisdiction of Passau. During his time the cathedral chapter made its appearance, but there is little information concerning its beginning as a distinct corporation with the right of electing a bishop. This right was much hampered by the exercise of imperial influence.

At the beginning of the Investiture Controversy, St. Altmann occupied the see (1065–1091) and was one of the few German bishops who adhered to Pope Gregory VII. Ulrich I, Count of Höfft (1092–1121), who was for a time driven from his see by Emperor Henry IV, furthered monastic reforms and the Crusades. Reginmar (1121–1138), Reginbert, Count of Hegenau (1136–1147) who took part in the crusade of Conrad III, and Conrad of Austria (1149–1164), a brother of Bishop Otto of Freising, were all much interested in the foundation of new monasteries and the reform for those already existing. Bishop Diepold of Berg went on the Third Crusade, accompanied by the dean of the cathedral, Tageno, whose diary is historically valuable.

Ulrich, Count of Andechs (1215–1221), was formally recognized as a prince of the empire at the Reichstag of Nuremberg in 1217. The reforms which were begun by Gebhard von Plaien (1221–1232) and Rüdiger von Rodeck (1233–1250) found a zealous promoter in Otto von Lonsdorf (1254–1265), one of the greatest bishops of Passau. He took stringent measures against the relaxed monasteries, introduced the Franciscans and Dominicans into his diocese, promoted the arts and sciences, and collected the old documents which had survived the storms of the preceding period, so that to him we owe almost all our knowledge of the early history of Passau. (See Schmidt, "Otto von Lonsdorf, Bischof zu Passau", Würzburg, 1903.) Bishop Peter, formerly Canon of Breslau, contributed to the House of Habsburg by bestowing episcopal fiefs on the sons of King Rudolph.

Under Bernhard of Brambach (1285–1313), Passau started striving to become a free imperial city. After an uprising in May 1298, the bishop granted the burghers, in the municipal ordinance of 1299, privileges in conformity with what was called the Bernhardine Charter. The cathedral having been burned down in 1281, he built a new cathedral which lasted until 1662. Albert III von Winkel (1363–1380) was particularly active in the struggle with the burghers and in resisting the robber-knights. The Black Death visited the bishopric under Gottfried II von Weitzenbeck (1342–1362). George I von Hohenlohe (1388–1421), who, after 1418, was imperial chancellor, energetically opposed the Hussites. During the time of Ulrich III von Nussdorf (1451–1479) the diocese suffered its first great curtailment by the formation of the new Diocese of Vienna (1468). This diocese was afterwards further enlarged at the expense of Passau by Pope Sixtus IV. Towards the close of the fifteenth century the conflict between an Austrian candidate for the see and a Bavarian brought about a state of war in the diocese.

The Protestant Reformation was kept out of all the Bavarian part of the diocese, except the Countship of Ortenburg, by the efforts of Ernest of Bavaria who, though never consecrated, ruled the diocese from 1517 to 1541. Lutheranism found many adherents, however, in the Austrian portion. Wolfgang I Count of Salm (1540–1555) and Urban von Trennbach (1561–1598) led the counter-Reformation. Under Wolfgang the Peace of Passau was concluded, in the summer of 1552. The last Bavarian prince-bishop was Urban, who in his struggles during the Reformation received substantial aid for the Austrian part of the diocese from Albert V, Duke of Bavaria, and, after 1576, from Emperor Rudolf II. All the successors of Urban were Austrians. Bishop Leopold I (1598–1625) (also Bishop of Strasburg after 1607) was one of the first to enter the Catholic League of 1609. In the Thirty Years' War he was loyal to his brother, Emperor Ferdinand II. Leopold II Wilhelm (1625–1662), son of Ferdinand II, a pious prince and a great benefactor of the City of Passau, especially after the great conflagration of 1662, finally united five bishoprics.

The Bishop-Prince Wenzelaus von Thun (1664–1673) began the new cathedral which was completed thirty years later by his successor Cardinal John Philip von Lamberg. The Cardinal-Prince and his nephew, also Cardinal-Prince Joseph Dominicus von Lamberg, some time later successor to his uncle (1723–1762), both became cardinals. They were brother and son to Franz Joseph I, Landgrave of Leuchtenberg, and both front-line diplomats for the Austrian court.

When Vienna was raised to an archdiocese in 1722, he relinquished the parishes beyond the Viennese Forest, hence was exempted from the metropolitan authority of Salzburg, and obtained the pallium for himself and his successors. Leopold Ernst, Count of Firmian (1763–1783), created cardinal in 1772, established an institute of theology at Passau and, after the suppression of the Jesuits, founded a lyceum. Under Joseph, Count of Auersperg (1783–1795), Emperor Joseph II took away two-thirds of the diocese to form the dioceses of Linz and St. Pölten and to enlarge for the last time the archdiocese of Vienna. The last prince-bishop, Leopold von Thun (1796–1826), saw the secularization of the old bishopric in 1803; the City of Passau and the temporalities on the left bank of the Inn and the right bank of the Ilz went to Bavaria, while the territory on the left banks of the Danube and of the Ilz went to Ferdinand III of Habsburg-Lorraine, the former Grand Duke of Tuscany, becoming part of the Electorate of Salzburg and afterwards to Austria. On 22 February 1803, when the Bavarians marched into Passau, the prince-bishop withdrew to his estates in Bohemia, and never revisited his former residence.

By the Bavarian Concordat of 1817, the diocese was given new boundaries. After the death of the last prince-bishop, Passau's exemption from metropolitan power ceased, and the diocese became suffragan of Munich-Freising.

Ordinaries

Auxiliary bishops
Johannes (1441–1465)
Sigismund Pirchan von Rosenberg, O. Cist. (1441–1472)
Benedikt Sibenhirter, O.S.B. (1452–1458)
Wolfgang Püchler, O.F.M. (1465–1475)
Albert Schönhofer (1473–1493)
Andreas Weinmair (1477–1491)
Nikolaus Kaps (1491–1499) Appointed, Auxiliary Bishop of Gurk
Bernhard Meurl von Leombach (1496–1526)
Heinrich Kurz (1526–1557)
Thomas Murner, O.F.M. (1530–1536)
Urban Sagstetter (1553–1556)
Erasmus Pagendorfer (1557–1561)
Michael Englmayr (1561–1568)
Christian Krypper (1570–1573)
Hector Wegmann (1575–1589)
Christoph Weilhamer (1589–1597)
Andreas Hofmann (bishop) (1597–1604)
Blasius Laubich (1604–1608)
Šimun Bratulić, O.S.P.P.E. (1598–1601)
Johannes Brenner (bishop) (1608–1629)
Johannes Kaspar Stredele (1631–1642)
Johannes Bartholomäus Kobolt von Tambach (1637–1645)
Nikolaus Aliprandi de Thomasis (1642)
Ulrich Grappler von Trappenburg (1646–1658)
Martin Geiger (1658–1669)
Jodok Brendt Hopner (1670–1682)
Johannes Maximus Stainer von Pleinfelden (1682–1692)
Johann Raymund Guidobald von Lamberg, O.F.M. Cap. (1701–1725)
Franciscus Aloysius von Lamberg (1725–1732)
Anton Joseph von Lamberg (1733–1747)
Ermest Amadeus Thomas von Attems (1735–1742)
Johannes Christoph Ludwig von Kuenburg (1747–1756)
Philipp Wirich Lorenz von Daun zu Sassenheim und Callenborn (1757–1763)
Joseph Adam Arco (1764–1773)
Franz Karl Maria Cajetan von Firmian (1773–1776)
Thomas Johann Kaspar von Thun und Hohenstein (1776–1795) Appointed, Bishop of Passau
Leopold Maximilian von Firmian (Frimian) (1797–1800)
Karl Kajetan von Gaisruck (Gaysruck) (1801–1818)
Adalbert von Pechmann (1824–1860)
Franz Xaver Eder (1977–1984) Appointed, Coadjutor Bishop of Passau

References

External links

Roman Catholic dioceses in Germany
Bavarian Circle
Passau
Prince-bishoprics of the Holy Roman Empire in Germany
Prince-bishoprics of the Holy Roman Empire in Austria